Lakshanika International School (LIS) is an international school affiliated with the Central Board of Secondary Education, India. The school is located in Ibrahim Bagh, Narsingi Road, close to Taramati Baradari, Hyderabad, Telangana, India. The school is run by Lotus Education Society.

References

External links
 Official website

Schools in Hyderabad, India
Schools in Telangana
International schools in India
Educational institutions in India with year of establishment missing